Ranjeet Mali (born 5 November 1988) is an Indian cricketer. Mali made his first class debut for Assam against Tripura at Agartala in the 2008-09 Ranji Trophy. He is a right-arm fast medium bowler. In November 2018, he took his 100th first class wicket in the Ranji Trophy match against Jharkhand.

References

External links
 

1988 births
Living people
People from Sonitpur district
Indian cricketers
Assam cricketers
Railways cricketers
Cricketers from Assam